Jean-Pierre Bastiani (6 June 1950 – 27 August 2021) was a French politician.

Biography
Bastiani was general councilor of the canton of Auterive from 1994 to 2008 and mayor of Auterive from 1989 to 2008 and again from 2014 to 2018. He was also elected to the National Assembly for Haute-Garonne's 7th constituency in 1993, earning 37.48% of the vote in the first round and 52.16% in the second, defeating minister of education Lionel Jospin. He did not run for re-election in 1997. He ran again in 2002 but was defeated by Patrick Lemasle.

Bastiani died on 27 August 2021 at the age of 71.

References

1950 births
2021 deaths
Politicians from Toulouse
Union for French Democracy politicians
Union for a Popular Movement politicians
Union of Democrats and Independents politicians
Deputies of the 10th National Assembly of the French Fifth Republic
French general councillors
Mayors of places in Occitania (administrative region)
21st-century French politicians